Matukutūruru (also Te Manurewa o Tamapahore or Wiri Mountain) is a volcano and Tūpuna Maunga (ancestral mountain) in Wiri, in the Auckland volcanic field. It had a scoria cone reaching 80 metres above sea level (around 50 m higher than the surrounding land), which was quarried away. The lava flows created 290m long Wiri Lava Cave. The hill was the site of a pā. In late 2011 the quarry lake was drained and fill-dumping began on the site.

Matukutūruru and nearby Matukutūreia are collectively known as Matukurua (also ngā Matukurua).

In the 2014 Treaty of Waitangi settlement between the Crown and the Ngā Mana Whenua o Tāmaki Makaurau collective of 13 Auckland iwi and hapu (also known as the Tāmaki Collective), ownership of the 14 Tūpuna Maunga of Tāmaki Makaurau / Auckland, was vested to the collective, including the volcano officially named Matukutūruru. The legislation specified that the land be held in trust "for the common benefit of Ngā Mana Whenua o Tāmaki Makaurau and the other people of Auckland". The Tūpuna Maunga o Tāmaki Makaurau Authority or Tūpuna Maunga Authority (TMA) is the co-governance organisation established to administer the 14 Tūpuna Maunga. Auckland Council manages the Tūpuna Maunga under the direction of the TMA.

References

City of Volcanoes: A geology of Auckland - Searle, Ernest J.; revised by Mayhill, R.D.; Longman Paul, 1981. First published 1964. .
Volcanoes of Auckland: A Field Guide. Hayward, B.W.; Auckland University Press, 2019, 335 pp. .

External links
 1957 view of Wiri Mountain
 View south from Mount Smart in 1923.  Wiri Mountain is the distant hill on the left.

Auckland volcanic field